Viktorija Budrytė-Winnersjo (née Budrytė; born 12 October 1989), known as Viktorija Budrytė, is a Lithuanian former footballer who played as a forward. She has been a member of the Lithuania women's national team.

She has degree of Plungės „Ryto“ pagrindinė mokykla and Sport class of Šiauliai „Vijolių“ vidurinė mokykla. Her first football trainer was Romaldas Kerpa and second  trainer was Rimantas Viktoravičius.

Personal life 
In July 2017 Budrytė married her wife Marina Melody Winnersjo in Sweden.

Her mother Vitalija Budrienė lives in England. Viktorija have four brothers and four sisters. Their names are Marius, Renatas, Laimonas, Mantas, Ina, Dovilė, Vaida and Vilija.

References

External links
 

1989 births
Living people
Women's association football forwards
Lithuanian women's footballers
Sportspeople from Plungė
Lithuania women's international footballers
Gintra Universitetas players
LGBT association football players
Lithuanian LGBT people